Christian Kohler (1859 - 1926) was a Canadian farmer and politician in Ontario. He represented Haldimand in the Legislative Assembly of Ontario as a Liberal member from 1911 to 1914.

He was born in Kohler, Haldimand County, Canada West, the son of Martin Kohler, a German immigrant. He was a livestock dealer in partnership with his brother Jacob. Kohler succeeded his brother as representative for Haldimand in the provincial assembly. He married Barbara Nie in 1884.

References 
 Canadian Parliamentary Guide, 1912, EJ Chambers

External links 

Ontario Liberal Party MPPs
1859 births
1926 deaths